Bodhmaya Kumari Yadav (also known as Bodh Maya Yadav) is a Nepali politician and a member of the House of Representatives of the federal parliament of Nepal. She was elected through the proportional representation system from CPN MC. In the 2013 elections for the 2nd constituent assembly, she was a candidate from Dhanusa-6 for the first-past-the post-system from the same party but was lost by Nepali Congress. Following the formation of Nepal Communist Party (NCP), she was appointed the central committee member of the party.

References

Living people
Nepal MPs 2017–2022
Nepal Communist Party (NCP) politicians
People from Dhanusha District
Communist Party of Nepal (Maoist Centre) politicians
1974 births